Hassall Green railway station is a disused railway station in Cheshire, England.

The line opened in 1852 to serve the salt and chemical works in the Sandbach area and passenger services were a very late addition, not being introduced until 1893, 41 years after the opening of the line.

The station at Hassall Green was a later addition to the passenger service.  Two intermediate stations on the line,  and  opened in 1893 but Hassall Green was only opened in 1905.  The station marked the end point of a single track section from Lawton and towards Sandbach the line was double track.

Increasing competition from bus services led to the station and line being closed for passenger services on 28 July 1930.  Parcels traffic continued to be handled at the station until 1947 when the station closed completely.

Freight traffic continued over the line until 1964 and the line was finally closed and lifted in 1971.

The signalbox and crossing gates are preserved and have since been relocated to Hadlow Road railway station in Willaston, Wirral, formally part of the Hooton and West Kirby branch line.

References
Notes

Sources
 
 
 

Disused railway stations in Cheshire
Former North Staffordshire Railway stations
Railway stations in Great Britain closed in 1930
Railway stations in Great Britain opened in 1905